After the dissolution of the Soviet Union in , its former republics started establishing their own carriers from the corresponding directorates Aeroflot had at these countries, causing the airline to shrink drastically. The fleet reduced from several thousand aircraft to a number slightly over 100 in 1993, helping the former Soviet Union's national airline to improve its accidents and incidents record sharply. The company experienced 42 events between 1990 and 1991 only, and had 41 occurrences in the rest of the decade. Despite this, the three deadliest accidents the airline went through in the decade occurred in the post-Soviet era, leaving a death toll of 257, each one involving more than 50 fatalities.

The most infamous crash and the second worst accident for the company in the decade occurred in  when an Airbus A310 that was flying the Moscow–Hong Kong route crashed in the Kemerovo Oblast shortly after the captain's son manipulated the controls of the aircraft, with the loss of 75 lives.

Overall, 525 people lost their lives either on board Aeroflot aircraft or on the ground. The number of aircraft the airline wrote off during the decade fell to 71, split into an Airbus A310-300, two Antonov An-12s, an Antonov An-124, 20 Antonov An-2s, five Antonov An-24s, two Antonov An-26s, five Antonov An-28s, two Ilyushin Il-14s, four Ilyushin Il-62s, two Ilyushin Il-76s, two Ilyushin Il-86s, five Let L-410s, six Tupolev Tu-134s, six Tupolev Tu-154s, seven Yakovlev Yak-40s and a Yakovlev Yak-42.

Following is a list of the accidents and incidents Aeroflot experienced during the decade.

List

See also

Aeroflot accidents and incidents
Aeroflot accidents and incidents in the 1950s
Aeroflot accidents and incidents in the 1960s
Aeroflot accidents and incidents in the 1970s
Aeroflot accidents and incidents in the 1980s
Transport in Russia
Transport in the Soviet Union

Footnotes

Notes

References

Lists of aviation accidents and incidents